Wacquemoulin is a railway station located in the commune of Wacquemoulin in the Oise department, France.  The station is served by TER Hauts-de-France trains (Amiens - Compiègne line).

See also
List of SNCF stations in Hauts-de-France

References

Railway stations in Oise